Belle and Sebastian is a 2013 French adventure drama film directed by Nicolas Vanier. It was based on the 1966 French novel Belle et Sébastien by Cécile Aubry, which in turn was based on the 1965 French TV series. The film was the first of a trilogy, as the second film adventure Belle & Sebastian: The Adventure Continues, was released on 9 December 2015, with the final film being Belle and Sebastien: Friends for Life, released in 2017.

Plot 
In the French Alps, during the year 1943, Sébastien is a seven year old orphan boy living with César, an adoptive "grandfather" and his niece, Angélina. The unusual little family lives in the small village of Saint-Martin, whose inhabitants, despite the German occupation, secretly organize the passage of Jewish exiles into Switzerland. The village is also plagued by a mysterious "Beast" who preys on the flocks of the shepherds and the inhabitants, including César's animals.

Sébastien is a very lonely child who is suffering from the absence of his mother. He believes that she migrated "to America, just over the mountains", and spends all his days in the mountains. One day, on the way home, he meets a huge dog, wild and completely discredited: it is the so-called "Beast". Sébastien quickly makes friends with the animal, a female livestock guardian dog, and names her "Belle" because he is struck by her beauty after she is cleaned up from the mud that she was coated with. Sébastien decides to keep his friendship with Belle a secret to protect her.

Meanwhile, a German patrol, commanded by the ambiguous Lieutenant Peter Braun, arrives in Saint-Martin to put an end to the secret escape route of the Jews. Sébastien, during one of his trips along with Belle, collides with two of the soldiers; Belle responds by attacking and injuring one of the soldiers. Lieutenant Braun orders the mayor of Saint-Martin to arrange a hunt to track down and kill the "Beast". Meanwhile, César discovers Sébastien's secret and is horrified. Knowing that Sébastien will try to prevent Belle from being shot, César gives the boy the wrong directions to the hunting area, but he is still able to interfere, at least for a while. Then César takes him out of the area, while the hunt goes on. César and the village men manage to find and hurt Belle. Sébastien escapes confinement, and finds the wounded dog and tries to help her. He is now furious with César, but asks for help from Dr. Guillaume, the village doctor and Angélina's boyfriend. After an initial hesitation (and being prodded with a con from Sébastien) he agrees to treat Belle and saves her life. 
 
Unbeknownst to Sébastien, Dr. Guillaume is also the one who is responsible for escorting the Jews to the Swiss border. One evening, the doctor hides a family in a cave prior to a trip to the border, when the sound of wolves is heard in the valley. The doctor goes out as the wolves start causing a ruckus in the sheepfold. Guillaume slips and falls into the sheepfold as Belle bounds down out of nowhere and drives off the wolves. The doctor sits up and moans: his ankle is broken, he cannot walk. He finds a sled, lies down on it, and starts pawing his way to town when Belle stops him, picks up the rope, and begins to tow him. She takes him to Angélina's house where everyone except Sébastien and Guillaume is surprised by the dog. César instantly apologizes to Sébastien for wanting to kill Belle.

Guillaume, who is now injured, can no longer lead the Jews, and his place is taken by Angélina and Sébastien, who followed her and sneaked into the cave behind her. The boy befriends Esther, the daughter of the two refugees that Guillaume was to escort, and by talking with her, he discovers that César lied to him about where America truly is. That evening, Sébastien creeps back into town and sneaks into the schoolhouse to look at a map. Later, César discovers him in the schoolhouse and reveals the truth: his mother died while giving birth to him. César was present by chance and agreed to take care of Sébastien; he has so far been silent or preferring to lie to protect him. Sébastien is sad, but now he knows he can always count on César and he makes peace with him. It is Christmas Eve, and César gives him a treasured gift: a pocket watch with a compass.

Meanwhile, the Germans realize that some Jews might try to escape on Christmas Day, and begin to scour the mountain passes. Angélina and the Jews leave the cave, but the trip is cut short by Lieutenant Braun. He shouts to her, and she herds the family faster up the mountain. He shouts to her again, but all of them are suddenly overwhelmed by an avalanche caused by his shouts. Lt. Braun, when dug out of the snow, surprisingly warns her to take another route to reach the border because his soldiers are patrolling the mountain. Angélina is moved.

The only possible way now is dangerous and full of crevasses; Sébastien boasts that Belle, thanks to her sense of smell, will guide them. Not without difficulty, Belle, Sébastien and Angélina manage to escape from the Germans and to bring the Jews to Switzerland, where they are greeted by a local guide. Here, Angélina reveals that she will go on to England to help win the war. She promises Sébastien that she will return once it's all over, leaving Belle and Sébastien to walk back home alone. The Swiss guide questions her if she is sure that he is able to make such a long, difficult journey on his own, but Angélina, in tears, replies that Sébastien is not all alone.

Cast 

 Félix Bossuet as Sébastien 
 Tchéky Karyo as César 
 Margaux Châtelier as Angélina 
 Dimitri Storoge as Docteur Guillaume 
 Andreas Pietschmann as Lieutenant Peter Braun 
 Urbain Cancelier as The Mayor  
 Mehdi El Glaoui as André
 Andrée Damant as Célestine 
 Paloma Palma as Esther 
 Karine Adrover as Esther's Mother
 Loïc Varrautn as Esther's Father
 Jan Oliver Scihroeder as Soldier Hans  
 Tom Sommerlatgte as Soldier Erich 
 Pasquale D'Incga as The Butcher
 Eric Soubelet as Fabien

Production 

In less than a week in Italy, "Belle and Sebastian" was the most-popular film at the box office, grossing . The facts narrated in the film are taken from the stories of French writer Cécile Aubry, who were then transported to the small screen as the 1960s television series of the 1960s. In the 1980s, "Belle and Sebastian" was adapted into a long series of Japanese cartoons, of which the film's director, Nicolas Vanier, was an avid fan: "As a child I was completely crazy in the TV series Belle and Sebastian, which is why, when I was offered this project, I was very intimidated! For me it was not a corny TV series, but a long series of episodes of one more beautiful 'other. Accept to make a film adaptation was a big challenge. When I was contacted by the production, suddenly everything I had tried watching Belle and Sébastien had awakened and felt compelled to make this film the best".

Félix Bossuet, the boy who plays the main role, was chosen from more than 2,400 children from the same director candidates because of a "lightning strike" as stated by Vanier.

Mehdi El Glaoui, the son of Cécile Aubry, who played Sebastian in the TV series of the same name in the 1960s, has a small role in the film as André.

Awards 
"Belle and Sebastian" was awarded Best Film in 2014 at the Children KinoFest, an international film festival in Ukraine.

Sequel

A sequel, Belle & Sebastian: The Adventure Continues, directed by Christian Duguay, and reuniting screenwriters Sales and Suarez as well as cast members Bossuet, Karyo, Chatelier and Cancelier, was released in December 2015.

References

External links 
 

2013 films
2010s adventure drama films
2013 war drama films
2010s French-language films
2010s German-language films
French adventure drama films
French war drama films
Films about dogs
Films about orphans
Films based on French novels
Films directed by Nicolas Vanier
Films set in 1943
Gaumont Film Company films
2013 drama films
Avalanches in film
2010s French films